The Ali Alsgozy Stadium is a football stadium situated in Tripoli, Libya.

The stadium has a capacity of around 3,000. It is named after the famous Al Ittihad defender Ali Alsgozy.

Football venues in Libya
Buildings and structures in Tripoli, Libya